Teplyk is an urban-type settlement in Vinnytsia Oblast, Ukraine. It formerly served as the administrative center of Teplyk Raion, and is now administered within Haisyn Raion. Population:

History 

The first written mention of Teplik is from the 15th century. Historical records show that the settlement emerged as a fortified border crossing of the Duchy of Lithuania. Tunnels and caves that were dug in those days still remain.  In the 15th and 16th centuries, Teplik was a small town which suffered frequent damage during enemy attacks.

In 1582, Ivan and Andriy Kishki shared ownership of the town and it became the property of the Ostrogski family. In 1645 Teplik went to Zhabokrytskyi. Then came Samuel Kalinowski, who annexed the land to Uman.

The population of Teplyk engages mainly in agriculture and handicrafts: mainly leatherworking, shoemaking and smithing. There were also merchants. Historians, researchers, and multiple other sources, explain the origin of the name of Teplyk. The most widespread and ancient belief is that Teplyk got its name from the natural conditions of the region (warm in Ukrainian is теплий – tepliy). This is according to a number of written sources in Polish and Russian. Another version of the name origin is that it comes from the small river the village sits on: Teplychka.

There were times when Teplik had a second name – Smilhorod. It is believed that this name came from the courage and resilience of the residence residents who defended their village from enemies and attackers. The ancient settlement of Teplik was small, it occupied only a triangular piece of land formed by the surrounding streams. They merge in the valley 300 meters from the hill on which the center of Teplik sits.

Located at the crossroads of trade routes, Teplik from the 17th to 19th centuries became a significant commercial and manufacturing point. The 300th anniversary of Teplyk was already met in the Russian Empire.

The unfading glory of the Teplyk residents continued when they defended themselves in the fight against the Nazi invaders. Over 600 residents and natives went to the front. Over 5000 of them gave their lives in the name of victory and more than 7000 soldiers were later awarded military honors.

During the post-war renewal of the city, new enterprises (particularly specializing in agriculture) built new factory buildings, consumer services, the District Council, the Department of the Interior, a city newspaper, a district print shop, hospital, school, State Tax Inspectorate, Palace of Culture and libraries. Over the past 20 years, more factories and commercial shops have appeared.

External links
 The murder of Teplyk Jews, in Yad Vashem website

References

Urban-type settlements in Haisyn Raion
Podolia Governorate